Cars in Cuba mainly consist of vintage, American-made automobiles that date back to as early as the 1940s. These commodities come from large companies, such as Chevrolet, Buick, and Ford models. The reason behind this abundance of old-fashioned cars was due to the U.S. embargo in 1962, which prohibits any exportation and importation or commerce between the U.S. and Cuba, including cars. After this embargo was legislated, Cubans also lost access to car parts but quickly became resourceful and successfully conserved the quality of their antiquated cars.

Background 
Although owning a car can be convenient, the streets of Cuba are often relatively quiet. Due to being under a communist regime, private ownership of materials such as cars have been illegal between 1959 and 2011 in Cuba. As a result, the majority of locals never personally owned a car, or if they did, it would have been owned prior to 1959. Vintage American cars, however, still live at the heart of Havana, where they are mainly used as taxis.

Culture 
In spite of the touristic attraction towards these antique vehicles, cars in Cuba are, perhaps, one of the most culturally stimulating aspects in this country. Vintage American cars still live at the heart of Havana, where they are mainly used as taxis. As a renowned touristic city, Havana's car industry highly depends on the profits that come from tourists who spend $20-$30 on taxi rides to get the full “vintage-car experience”.

References 

Vehicles of Cuba
Boycotts of Cuba